"Lady Blue" is the 1975 hit love song by singer–songwriter Leon Russell.  It was a track on his LP album, Will O' the Wisp.

The song reached number 14 on the U.S. Billboard Hot 100 on Nov. 1, 1975.

The song featured a saxophone solo in the instrumental section.

The first live play of the song in a concert was by George Benson on September 30, 1977 at The Roxy in West Hollywood, CA.  His studio version reached #39 on the U.S. R&B chart in 1978. 
Edgar Winter and Leon Russell performed Lady Blue live on July 28, 1987 at Hunts in Burlington, VT.

Chart performance

Weekly charts

References

External links
 YouTube, Leon Russell, Lady Blue 1975

1975 songs
Leon Russell songs
Songs written by Leon Russell
Song recordings produced by Denny Cordell